The Board of Architectural Education is no longer appointed.  It had been a statutory body in the United Kingdom constituted under section 5 of the Architects (Registration) Act, 1931.

The Act was citable with two amending Acts as the Architects (Registration) Acts, 1931 to 1938. Further amendments and changes enacted by the Housing Grants, Construction and Regeneration Act 1996 included abolition of the statutory Board of Architectural Education.

Nomination and appointment to the Board

Subsection 5(1) of the 1931 Act had required the Board of Architectural Education to be appointed annually by the Architects' Registration Council of the United Kingdom (ARCUK) ("the Council").  The Board was to be constituted in accordance with the Second Schedule of the Act.  This included:

 one person nominated by the Liverpool School of Architecture and the nine other Schools of Architecture named in the Schedule;
 four persons nominated jointly by the Department of Architecture in the University of Cambridge and the eight other Schools of Architecture named in the Schedule;
 the Director of Education of the School of Architecture of the Architectural Association in London;
 a total of 14 persons nominated by various other educational bodies, and
 24 registered persons nominated by the Council.

The Board's duty

Subsection 5(2) of the 1931 Act had made it the duty of the Board (of Architectural Education) to recommend to the Council:

 the recognition of any examinations in architecture the passing of which ought, in the opinion of the Board (of Architectural Education), to qualify persons for registration in the Register of Registered Architects, and
 the holding of any examinations in architecture which ought, in the opinion of the Board (of Architectural Education), to be passed by applicants for registration.

Statutory nomenclature

The amendments to the Architects (Registration) Acts, 1931 to 1938 which were made by the Housing Grants, Construction and Regeneration Act 1996 included the abolition of the statutory Board of Architectural Education and renaming the Architects' Registration Council of the United Kingdom as the Architects Registration Board.  The Board of Architectural Education is not mentioned in the Architects Act 1997, which consolidated and replaced the Acts of 1931 to 1938, as amended by the Act of 1996.

By section 26, "the Board" in the Architects Act 1997 was henceforth to mean the registration body renamed as the Architects Registration Board (ARB), which had previously been named the Architects' Registration Council of the United Kingdom (ARCUK).

See also
Registration of architects in the United Kingdom

References

Registration of architects in the United Kingdom
Architecture organisations based in the United Kingdom
Architectural education